Hawkes Children's Library is a historic library building in Cedartown, Georgia. Albert King Hawkes  was a children's library and theater advocate from Atlanta who desired the libraries in Georgia's towns. This Hawkes Children's Library was designed by Neel Reid and built in 1921. It is now a museum operated by the Polk County Historical Society. It was listed on the National Register of Historic Places on November 24, 1980. It is located on North College Street.

See also
National Register of Historic Places listings in Polk County, Georgia
Hawkes Children's Library (West Point, Georgia)

References

Library buildings completed in 1921
Theatres completed in 1921
Libraries on the National Register of Historic Places in Georgia (U.S. state)
Theatres on the National Register of Historic Places in Georgia (U.S. state)
Buildings and structures in Polk County, Georgia
National Register of Historic Places in Polk County, Georgia
Children's libraries